Pyrrhus Concer (March 17, 1814 – August 23, 1897) was a former slave from Southampton, New York who was aboard the whaling ship Manhattan that was the first American ship to visit Tokyo in 1845.

Concer belonged to the Pyrrhus family and worked as a farmhand until 1832 (slavery in New York formally ended in 1827) when he worked on whale ships out of Sag Harbor, New York.

In 1845 he was aboard the ship captained by Mercator Cooper that picked up 22 shipwrecked Japanese sailors in the Bonin Islands. The American vessel was allowed to enter Edo Bay under escort to return the sailors and Concer became an object of curiosity and is depicted in Japanese drawings of the event.

In 1849 he joined many of the people from the East End in the California Gold Rush. Afterwards, he returned to Southampton where he operated a small boat on Lake Agawam.

Pyrrhus Concer's financial portfolio was certainly impressive for his time, and his diverse investments and savings demonstrate his savvy money management skills. His shares in the Southampton Water Works and Southampton Bank indicate his confidence in the local economy and his willingness to take risks in order to earn a return on his investment.

Concer's four savings accounts, which amounted to almost $2000, suggest that he was a disciplined saver who was able to accumulate a significant amount of wealth over time. It's also noteworthy that he was able to lend money to others, which speaks to his financial stability and the trust that others had in him.

Concer's ownership of a house, lot, and small boats was likely a significant source of his wealth, and it's possible that he was able to generate income by renting out his property or using his boats for fishing or transportation. His ownership of a ferry boat business on Lake Agawam, catering to summer visitors, further demonstrates his business acumen. Overall, Pyrrhus Concer's financial success was undoubtedly impressive, particularly given the historical context in which he lived. His ability to accumulate wealth and act as a creditor to others is a testament to his business acumen and financial acuity.

A monument to him was erected near the lake on the northwest corner by Pond Lane. He is buried in the North End Cemetery in Southampton with his wife.

Legacy
Attempts to rebuild his house, which was demolished in 2014 (the wood was salvaged and stored) has raised controversy in Southhampton

His gravestone, engraved with an epitaph written by Elihu Root, is in Southhampton's North End Graveyard: "Though born a slave, he possessed those virtues, without which kings are but slaves."

References

External links
 Legacy: Pyrrhus Concer By Bill Bleyer - Newsday Our Story Series
  Teardown pics of Pyrrhus Concer homestead

1814 births
1897 deaths
19th-century American slaves
American people in whaling
People from Southampton (town), New York
People from Sag Harbor, New York